Fruit Without Love is a 1956 West German romantic drama film directed by Ulrich Erfurth and starring Gertrud Kückelmann, Bernhard Wicki and Claus Holm. It was made at the Spandau Studios in West Berlin. The film's sets were designed by the art director Rolf Zehetbauer.

Cast
 Gertrud Kückelmann as Barbara Kling
 Bernhard Wicki as Dr. Kolb
 Claus Holm as Georg Kling
 Paul Dahlke as Prof. Schillinger
 Erika von Thellmann as Frau Gordenberg, Barbaras Mutter
 Irina Garden as Anke
 Siegmar Schneider
 Alexa von Porembsky as Anna
 Kurt Weitkamp as Mano, Dr.Kolbs Assistant
 Liesl Tirsch as Donna Pilar
 Hilde Volk as Edith Keppler
 Ruth Nimbach
 Alfred Cogho as Dr.Renner, Dr.Kolbs Assistant
 Stanislav as Frederico
 Lou Seitz
 Walter Werner

References

Bibliography 
 Bock, Hans-Michael & Bergfelder, Tim. The Concise CineGraph. Encyclopedia of German Cinema. Berghahn Books, 2009.

External links 
 

1956 films
West German films
German romantic drama films
1956 romantic drama films
1950s German-language films
Films directed by Ulrich Erfurth
Columbia Pictures films
1950s pregnancy films
German pregnancy films
Films shot at Spandau Studios
1950s German films
German black-and-white films